Gifford Peaks are a line of sharp peaks and ridges along the escarpment at the west side of the Heritage Range, located between Watlack Hills and Soholt Peaks. They were named by the University of Minnesota Geological Party of 1963–64 for Chief Warrant Officer Leonard A. Gifford, a pilot of the 62nd Transportation Detachment who aided the party.

See also
 Mountains in Antarctica

Geographical features include:

 Fendorf Glacier
 Cochran Peak
 Lamb Peak
 Maagoe Peak

References

Mountains of Ellsworth Land